The Cascade Locks and Canal was a navigation project on the Columbia River between the U.S. states of Oregon and Washington, completed in 1896. It allowed the steamboats of the Columbia River to bypass the Cascades Rapids, and thereby opened a passage from the lower parts of the river as far as The Dalles. The locks were submerged and rendered obsolete in 1938, when the Bonneville Dam was constructed, along with a new set of locks, a short way downstream.

Design and construction

As rail competition grew, and forced steamboats off their old routes, shippers and steamboat lines began agitating Congress to allocate funds for improvements to the river, in the form of canals and locks, that would restore their competitive position relative to the railroads.  The two main improvements sought on the Columbia were the Cascade Locks and, about twenty years later, the Celilo Canal and Locks.

Studies for a canal at the Cascades had begun in 1875, but interest tapered off when Oregon Railroad and Navigation Company (O.R.& N.) finished the railroad to The Dalles and took its boats off the middle river. Anti-monopoly shippers eventually got Congress to allocate funds in 1893 to begin the canal and locks at the Cascades, which were completed in November 1896. The locks could raise a vessel 14' at high water and 24' at low water.

The locks were carefully designed to address the great variation in the height of the river, the difference between high and low water being . This condition made it necessary to build a series of three sets of gates, increasing in height from the lower entrance to the huge upper guard gate, only two sets being used at one time. When the river was low, the upper guard gates remained open continually and the lower sets were operated. When the water rose enough to  drown the lower gates, they were swung open and the lifting work was done by the others.

Effect on river traffic

In an 1897 article written shortly after their completion, Scientific American was optimistic about the future of the locks, saying:

As it turns out, completion of the locks and the  canal leading from the east end of the locks, produced some increase in traffic, but not as much increase in riverine traffic as had been hoped. The North Bank railroad was also completed along the Columbia, which took more business away from the boats.  As a result, the Regulator Line, which had been running Dalles City, Regulator, and Bailey Gatzert on the lower Columbia, and, through the locks, on the middle Columbia, sold out to James J. Hill, owner of the Great Northern and other railroads.  Not long later, in 1912, the Panama Canal Act made it illegal for a railroad to be owned in common with a competing steamboat line, so in 1915, Great Northern sold its boats.

Current status

The lower lock and the canal were flooded when the Bonneville Dam was completed in the 1930s.  The upper part of the higher lock is still visible and part of Cascade Locks Marine Park in the city of Cascade Locks, Oregon. The park is listed on the National Register of Historic Places.

See also
Celilo Canal
Columbia Gorge
Fort Cascades
Steamboats of the Columbia River
Shaver Transportation Company

References

External links

Photographs
 Construction of Cascades Locks, 12/01/1883
 Looking east toward Cascades Locks, 1914
 Dalles City, Regulator and another, unidentified, sternwheeler passing through Cascade Locks
 Charles Spencer near Cascade Locks
 Maria, Dalles City, Harvest Queen and Sarah Dixon waiting to lock through on the opening day of Cascades Locks, November 8, 1896
tinted postcard showing Bailey Gatzert entering Cascade Locks from the east
Cascade Locks from the west, possibly taken from the Bridge of the Gods
photo looking upriver showing Bridge of the Gods with Cascade Locks on right
 Dalles City, Regulator', and one other steamboat in Cascade Locks  This photograph clearly shows the size of the locks in comparison to the size and number of boats in them.

Steamboats of Oregon
Steamboats of Washington (state)
Columbia River Gorge
Canals on the National Register of Historic Places in Oregon
Locks on the National Register of Historic Places in Oregon
Transportation buildings and structures in Hood River County, Oregon
National Register of Historic Places in Hood River County, Oregon
1896 establishments in Oregon
Canals opened in 1896
Canals in Washington (state)
History of transportation in Washington (state)